The Hills Shire (from 1906–2008 as Baulkham Hills Shire) is a local government area in the Greater Sydney region of Sydney, New South Wales, Australia. The suburb is north-west of the Sydney central business district, and encompasses  stretching from the M2 Hills Motorway in the south to Wiseman's Ferry on the Hawkesbury River in the north.

The current Mayor of The Hills Shire is Dr. Peter Gangemi (Liberal), who was elected on 21 December 2021.

Suburbs in the local government area 
Suburbs at least partially within The Hills Shire are:

 Annangrove
 Baulkham Hills (shared with City of Parramatta Council)
 Beaumont Hills
 Bella Vista
 Box Hill
 Castle Hill (shared with Hornsby Shire)
 Cattai (shared with City of Hawkesbury)
 Dural (shared with Hornsby Shire)
 Gables
 Glenhaven (shared with Hornsby Shire)
 Glenorie (shared with Hornsby Shire)
 Kellyville
 Kenthurst
 Leets Vale (shared with City of Hawkesbury)
 Lower Portland (shared with City of Hawkesbury)
 Maraylya (shared with City of Hawkesbury)
 Maroota (shared with Hornsby Shire)
 Middle Dural (shared with Hornsby Shire)
 Nelson
 North Kellyville
 North Rocks (shared with City of Parramatta Council)
 Norwest (council seat)
 Rouse Hill (shared with City of Blacktown)
 Sackville North
 South Maroota
 West Pennant Hills (shared with Hornsby Shire)
 Winston Hills (shared with City of Parramatta Council)
 Wisemans Ferry (shared with Central Coast Council, City of Hawkesbury and Hornsby Shire)

Demographics 
Aboriginal and Torres Strait Islander people made up 0.5 per cent of the population; significantly below the NSW and Australian averages of 2.9 and 2.8 per cent respectively. The median age of people in The Hills Shire was 38 years. Children aged 0 – 14 years made up 21.4 per cent of the population and people aged 65 years and over made up 13.5 per cent of the population. Of people in the area aged 15 years and over, 61.6 per cent were married and 7.1 per cent were either divorced or separated.

Total population growth of Australia for the period between the 2011 and 2016 census periods was 8.8 per cent. The median weekly income for residents within The Hills Shire was approximately 150% higher than the national average.

At the 2016 census, the proportion of residents in The Hills local government area who stated their ancestry as Australian or Anglo-Saxon approached 32 per cent of all residents. In excess of 64 per cent of all residents in The Hills Shire nominated a religious affiliation with Christianity at the 2016 census, which was in excess of the national average of 57.7 per cent. Meanwhile, as at the census date, compared to the national average, households in The Hills local government area had a higher than average proportion (37.2 per cent) where two or more languages are spoken (national average was 22.2 per cent); and a lower proportion (65.3 per cent) where English only was spoken at home (national average was 72.7 per cent).

Current Council composition and election method
The Hills Shire Council is composed of twelve Councillors elected proportionally as four separate wards, each electing three Councillors. All Councillors are elected for a fixed four-year term of office. A referendum held on 1 September 2015 changed the system of electing the Mayor, from annual election by the councillors in favour of direct election of the Mayor by electors for a four-year term, which took effect from the September 2017 election. The most recent election was held on 15 Octobers 2021, and the makeup of the Council is as follows:

The current Council, elected in 2017, in order of election by ward, is:

History

The earliest records of human settlement date back to the early 1800s when Dharug Aborigines inhabited the region. Governor Arthur Phillip is said to be the first European to have visited the Hills in 1788. The Hills Shire started developing gradually with its new road systems and farming as more Europeans settled here. The first school started in 1840 followed by a general store and a post office. In 1902, the tram from Parramatta to Baulkham Hills was inaugurated and telephone links were established by 1907. The population rose steadily over the years along with infrastructure development of the Hills Shire.

A 2015 review of local government boundaries by the NSW Government Independent Pricing and Regulatory Tribunal (IPART) recommended that The Hills Shire merge with adjoining councils. The government considered two proposals. Following an independent review, on 12 May 2016 the Minister for Local Government announced that the merger of parts of The Hills Shire suburbs south of the M2 Motorway (North Rocks, Northmead and part of Baulkham Hills) with the City of Parramatta to form a revised City of Parramatta Council, with immediate effect. Other proposals impacting The Hills Shire were rejected by the Government.

In June 2020, Councillor Brooke Collins made national news for controversially objecting to the Welcome to Country, reportedly stating "How do you know they didn’t wipe out another race when they arrived here 70,000 years ago?".

Heritage listings 
The Hills Shire has a number of heritage-listed sites, including:
 Baulkham Hills, Seven Hills Road: Pearce Family Cemetery
 Bella Vista, Elizabeth Macarthur Drive: Bella Vista (homestead)
 Box Hill, 10 Terry Road: Box Hill House
 Box Hill, Windsor Road: Box Hill Inn
 Castle Hill, Gilbert Road: Third Government Farm
 Castle Hill, 221 Old Northern Road: St Paul's Anglican Church, Castle Hill (former)
 Cattai, Wisemans Ferry Road: Cattai Estate
 Maroota South, Wisemans Ferry Road: Great Drain
 Rouse Hill, The Water Lane: Hunting Lodge, Rouse Hill
 Rouse Hill, Windsor Road: Royal Oak Inn, Rouse Hill

Recent controversies
In 2020, the Hills Shire Council, whose local government area covers Darug land, caused controversy by rejecting requests to include an Acknowledgment of Country at its meetings. The Hills Shire Council is the only Sydney local council that does not include an Acknowledgment of Country at its meetings.

Sister cities

  County Wexford, Ireland
  Cootamundra, Australia

See also
 Hills District
 Hills Centre
Greater Western Sydney

References

External links
 The Hills Shire Council

 
Local government areas in Sydney
1906 establishments in Australia